The 1986 Southwest Texas State Bobcats football team was an American football team that represented Southwest Texas State University (now known as Texas State University) during the 1986 NCAA Division I-AA football season as a member of the Gulf Star Conference (GSC). In their fourth year under head coach John O'Hara, the team compiled an overall record of 4–7 with a mark of 2–2 in conference play.

Schedule

References

Southwest Texas State
Texas State Bobcats football seasons
Southwest Texas State Bobcats football